The Estates General of 1632 was a parliamentary assembly of representatives of the constituent provinces of the Habsburg Netherlands. It was the last such assembly.

Crisis
It had been over thirty years since a gathering of the Estates General had been convened by the Habsburg rulers in the Low Countries. In a situation of deep political crisis, the Governor-General, Infanta Isabella Clara Eugenia, called the Estates General to rally the political elites to the Habsburg cause. The letters convoking the assembly were sent on 30 July, with the date for the opening set as 7 September. The assembly was dissolved on 5 July 1634.

Delegates
The delegates attending were as follows.

References

Historical legislatures in Belgium
17th-century elections in Europe
1632 in politics
1632 in the Habsburg Netherlands